Raleigh Ashlin Skelton (21 December 1906 – 7 December 1970) is best known for his work on the history of cartography and particularly his attempts to prove the authenticity of the Vinland map.

Life
An enigmatic personality, Skelton was known as "Peter". Skelton was born in Plymouth, England. He was educated at Aldenham School and Pembroke College, Cambridge. He served as the Assistant Keeper of the Department of Printed Books of the British Museum from 1931 to 1953, with a break for military service from 1939 to 1945, and as Deputy Keeper from 1953 to 1967. He began work in the Map Room of the British Museum upon his return from military service in 1945 and in 1950 became the Superintendent, in which post he continued until his retirement in 1967. 

He died in a car crash in December 1970.

Works
 The Vinland Map and the Tartar Relation, written with Thomas E. Marston, and George Painter, by Yale University Press,
 History of Cartography (with Leo Bagrow), originally published in London and Cambridge by C. A. Watts and Harvard University Press in 1964.
 Skelton wrote a number of articles and books on maps of explorers including Captain James Cook's maps of Newfoundland, including The Marine Surveys of Captain James Cook in North America 1758-1768, and the English translation and commentary to the facsimile edition of Antonio Pigafetta's narrative account of the first circumnavigation by Magellan (1519-1522), Yale University Press, 1969.

Professional activities
Skelton served as the Honorary Secretary of the Hakluyt Society from 1946 to 1966. He was the General Editor of Imago Mundi, the major journal in the field of the history of cartography, from 1957 to 1970. This was a collaboration with R. V. Tooley. He was Chair of the Working Group on Early Maps of the International Geographical Union from 1961. He was also a member of the Académie Internationale d'Histoire des Sciences and of various other societies concerned with history, geography, archaeology, bibliography and archives. During a sabbatical leave in 1962–63, he served as consultant and Acting Map Curator at Harvard University in the Widener Library.

Honours
Skelton was elected a Fellow of the Society of Antiquaries of London (FSA) in 1951. He was awarded the Gill Memorial of the Royal Geographical Society in 1957 and its Victoria Medal in 1970.

References

External links
Bibliographic Essay: History of Cartography 

1906 births
1970 deaths
Writers from Plymouth, Devon
Historians of cartography
People educated at Aldenham School
Employees of the British Library
Fellows of the Society of Antiquaries of London
Road incident deaths in England
20th-century English historians
Victoria Medal recipients